This article gives the detailed results of each FIVB Volleyball Women's World Championship.

Debut of national teams

Summary
Legend
 – Champions
 – Runners-up
 – Third place
 – Fourth place
 – Did not enter / Did not qualify
 – Hosts
Q – Qualified for forthcoming tournament

All-time performance

See also

National team appearances in the FIVB Volleyball Men's World Championship
List of FIVB Volleyball Women's World Championship finals

References

Results
Volleyball records and statistics